The Paraitinga River is a river of São Paulo state in southeastern Brazil. The Paraitinga is a tributary of the Tietê River, which it enters near Biritiba-Mirim.

See also
List of rivers of São Paulo

References

Brazilian Ministry of Transport

Rivers of São Paulo (state)